Pattin (also known as Pattina, Patina, Unqu and Unqi), was an ancient Luwian Syro-Hittite state at the beginning of the 1st millennium BC. It was known to the Assyrians as Unqi and Aramaeans as Unqu.

It was located at the north-western coast of ancient Syria, associated with the modern-day Sanjak of Alexandretta. The capital of the state was Kinalua (Kunalua, Kalneh, or  Kinaluwa), which has been tentatively associated with Tell Tayinat in modern-day Turkey.

The state was formed in the 9th century BC towards the end of the Dark Age period, and shared a north-western border with the Syro-Hittite state of Quwê. Khazazu (modern-day Azaz) was one of Pattin's dependencies which was invaded by Assyria around 870 BC. The frontier fortress of Aribua (associated with the modern-day region of Idlib) within the land of Lukhuti to the immediate south of Pattin was also ravaged.

References

See also
Ancient regions of Anatolia

Aramean states
Ancient Syria
Syro-Hittite states